These are historical figures credited with founding religions or religious philosophies, or who codified older known religious traditions. The list includes those who have founded a specific major denomination within a larger religion.

Legendary/semi-historical

Ancient (before AD 500)

Medieval to Early Modern (500–1800 AD)

New religious movements (post-1800)

See also
Burial places of founders of world religions
List of Buddha claimants
List of messiah claimants
List of people who have been considered deities
List of religions and spiritual traditions
Lists of religious leaders by century
Timeline of religion

Notes

References

Bibliography

 

 
 
 

 
 

 
Founders
Founders
Founders